Chen I-hsing is a Taiwanese politician. He was the Political Deputy Minister of the Ministry of Education (MOE) of the Executive Yuan from 2009 until October 2013.

Early life
Chen obtained his bachelor's degree, master's degree and doctoral degree from National Taiwan University in 1979, 1983 and 1999 respectively.

Early career
Chen had served as officer, specialist, division head and commissioner within the MOE in 1982–1995. Afterwards, he served as Director of National Taiwan Arts Education Center until 1996. In 1996–2005, he became the assistant commissioner of the department of education of Taipei City Government. In 2005–2007, he was the director of the department of secondary education of MOE. In 2007–2009, he became the director of National Taiwan Science Education Center.

References

Living people
Taiwanese Ministers of Education
Year of birth missing (living people)
National Taiwan University alumni